Vanity Fair is a 1915 silent film drama directed by Eugene Nowland and Charles Brabin and starring Mrs. Fiske, a renowned Broadway stage actress. The Edison Company produced and released the film. Mrs. Fiske had starred in the 1899 hit Broadway play Becky Sharp based on William Thackeray's 1848 novel of the same name. Here she recreates the role for Edison's cameras. This film marks Mrs. Fiske's second feature film as she had starred in Tess of the d'Urbervilles for Adolph Zukor in 1913. Despite the popularity of Vanity Fair, Mrs. Fiske never made another motion picture.

An earlier version was made in 1911 with Helen Gardner. A British feature appeared in 1922 and in 1923 Goldwyn Pictures made Vanity Fair.

The film is preserved in the Library of Congress collection.

Cast
Mrs. Fiske - Becky Sharp
Shirley Mason - Becky as a child (*as Leonie Flugrath)
Yale Benner - Rakedell Sharp
Helen Fulton - Amelia Sedley
William Wadsworth - Joseph Sedley
Richard Tucker - George Osborne
Robert Brower - Mr. Osborne
Frank McGlynn Sr. - Captain William Dobbin
Bigelow Cooper - Rawdon Crawley
George A. Wright - Lord Steyne
Maurice Steuart - George  Sedley Osborne (as Maurice Stewart, Jr.)
Helen Strickland - Lady Steyne
Philip Quinn - Napoleon
John Sturgeon - Major O'Dowd
Arthur Row - Pitt Crawley

References

External links
 Vanity Fair at IMDb.com

excerpt, Vanity Fair available for free download at Internet Archive

1915 films
American silent feature films
Films directed by Charles Brabin
Films based on Vanity Fair (novel)
1915 drama films
Silent American drama films
American black-and-white films
Films set in London
1910s American films